Annie F. Luetkemeyer is an American physician and researcher who is Professor of Medicine and Infectious Diseases at the University of California, San Francisco. She specializes in infectious diseases, in particular tuberculosis, human immunodeficiency virus and viral hepatitis. During the COVID-19 pandemic Luetkemeyer led a clinical trial of remdesivir. She has also researched treatment of COVID-19 as a co-infection with HIV.

Early life and education
Luetkemeyer was born in Baltimore, Maryland, to Suzanne Luetkemeyer (née Frey) and John Alexander Luetkemeyer Jr., a commercial real estate developer. She is the youngest of three sisters, one of whom is the actor Julie Bowen. She grew up in Ruxton-Riderwood, Maryland. In 1984, Luetkemeyer graduated from the Calvert School.

In 1994, Luetkemeyer received an AB with distinction in American Studies from Stanford University. In 1999, she received an M.D. in medicine from Harvard Medical School. In 2002 and 2003, Luetkemeyer trained in internal medicine at the University of California, San Francisco. In 2006, she completed advance training in clinical research there, and then an infectious disease fellowship in 2007.

Career
In 2012 Luetkemeyer called for investigations into the doses of medications used for the treatment of HIV infection and tuberculosis. The Food and Drug Administration had rewritten the recommendations in 2012. In a series of small studies in Europe it had been shown that rifampicin, a drug used to treat tuberculosis, could limit the effectiveness of efavirenz, a drug used to treat HIV. The drugs interact through a liver enzyme (cytochrome P450) that is produced at elevated levels in patients who take rifampicin, and breaks down the efavirenz. To overcome this, the 2012 FDA recommendations proposed larger doses of efavirenz. Luetkemeyer argued that the recommendations were not appropriate for all populations in the United States, and could result in more drug toxicity. She showed that increasing the dosage of efavirenz may cause more side effects—as well as coming at a greater financial cost.

During the COVID-19 pandemic, Luetkemeyer led investigations into potential therapies for the disease. She is a member of the UCSF cross-campus COVID-19 task force. In line with most official advice, Luetkemeyer called for older people and those with preexisting conditions to be more careful during the outbreak, as the virus "taxes all organ systems". She studied which COVID-19 patients were most likely to benefit from treatment, when during the illness was the best time for treatment, and which types of treatment (antivirals or anti-inflammatories) were most appropriate. She has also outlined what pre- and post-exposure prophylaxis healthcare workers and household contacts can do to prevent disease spread. Luetkemeyer has called for more randomized controlled trials to assess the impact of hydroxychloroquine. She is leading a clinical trial of the drug remdesivir. The San Francisco General Hospital SARS-CoV-2 guidelines recommend treatment only if patients are hospitalized or have strong risk factors for progression into severe disease. As of March 2020, the guidelines included remdesivir, or hydroxychloroquine if remdesivir was not feasible.

Selected works and publications

References

External links
 Annie Luetkemeyer at University of California, San Francisco
 Annie Luetkemeyer at UCSF School of Medicine

Living people
Year of birth missing (living people)
Harvard Medical School alumni
University of California, San Francisco alumni
University of California, San Francisco faculty
Stanford University alumni